The Liberty Bridge, completed in 1928, connects downtown Pittsburgh, Pennsylvania, to the Liberty Tunnels and the South Hills neighborhoods beyond. It crosses the Monongahela River and intersects Interstate 579 (the Crosstown Boulevard) at its northern terminus.

History

The Liberty Bridge is a steel cantilever bridge and was constructed as the missing link between downtown Pittsburgh and the Liberty Tunnel, which had been constructed four years earlier in 1924 as a link to the South Hills. The bridge opened on March 27, 1928, following a  vehicle parade from the southern suburbs of the city, which crossed the Smithfield Street Bridge and proceeded through downtown before ending at the southern end of the new bridge.

It was designed by George S. Richardson and cost $3,456,000 to build. It is 2663' 3/16" long, though the main span is 448' and the water clearance is 44.4'.

It was renovated in 1982 by the Dick Corporation, at a cost of $32 million.

Fire
On September 2, 2016 the Liberty Bridge was closed for 24 days, following a fire during construction work on the bridge. Intense heat from burning plastic piping had caused a  steel beam (compression chord) to buckle. The bridge reopened to weight-limited traffic on September 26th, and full traffic on September 30th. The Pennsylvania Department of Transportation assessed the value of the damages at over $3 million.

See also
List of bridges documented by the Historic American Engineering Record in Pennsylvania
List of crossings of the Monongahela River

References

External links
Liberty Bridge on pghbridges.com

Bridges in Pittsburgh
Bridges over the Monongahela River
Road bridges on the National Register of Historic Places in Pennsylvania
Bridges completed in 1928
Historic American Engineering Record in Pennsylvania
Roads with a reversible lane
1928 establishments in Pennsylvania
National Register of Historic Places in Pittsburgh
Steel bridges in the United States
Cantilever bridges in the United States